Robert Appleby Bartram may refer to:

Sir Robert Appleby Bartram (shipbuilder) (1835–1925), British shipbuilder
Robert Appleby Bartram (British Army officer) (1894–1981), shipbuilder, British Army officer and namesake grandson of the above

See also
Robert Appleby (disambiguation)